William Martin Joel (born May 9, 1949) is an American singer, pianist, and songwriter. Commonly nicknamed the "Piano Man" after his signature song of the same name, he has led a commercially successful career as a solo artist since the 1970s, having released 12 pop and rock studio albums from 1971 to 1993 as well as one studio album of classical compositions in 2001. He is one of the best-selling music artists of all time, as well as the seventh-best-selling recording artist and the fourth-best-selling solo artist in the United States, with over 160 million records sold worldwide. His 1985 compilation album, Greatest Hits Vol. 1 & 2, is one of the best-selling albums in the United States. 

Born in The Bronx, Joel grew up on Long Island; both places influenced his music. Growing up, he took piano lessons at his mother's insistence. After dropping out of high school to pursue a music career, Joel took part in two short-lived bands, The Hassles and Attila, before signing a record deal with Family Productions and starting off a solo career in 1971 with his first release Cold Spring Harbor. In 1972, Joel caught the attention of Columbia Records after a live radio performance of the song "Captain Jack" became popular in Philadelphia, prompting him to sign a new record deal with the company and release his second album, Piano Man, in 1973. After Streetlife Serenade and Turnstiles in 1974 and 1976 respectively, Joel released his critical and commercial breakthrough album, The Stranger, in 1977. This album became Columbia's bestselling release, selling over 10 million copies and spawning several hit singles, including "Just the Way You Are", "Movin' Out (Anthony's Song)", "Only the Good Die Young", and "She's Always a Woman"; the album also contains the popular album tracks "Scenes from an Italian Restaurant", Joel's favorite of his own songs which has become a firm staple of his live shows, and "Vienna", also one of Joel's personal favorites and nowadays one of his most streamed songs on the internet.

Joel's next album, 52nd Street, was released in 1978 and it soon became his first album to peak at No.1 on the Billboard 200 chart. Joel released his seventh studio album, Glass Houses, in 1980 in an attempt to further establish himself as a rock artist; this release featured "It's Still Rock and Roll to Me" (Joel's first single to top the Billboard Hot 100 chart), "You May Be Right", "Don't Ask Me Why", and "Sometimes a Fantasy". His next album, The Nylon Curtain, was released in 1982, and stemmed from a desire to create more lyrically and melodically ambitious music. An Innocent Man, released in 1983, served as a homage to genres of music which Joel had grown up with in the 1950s, such as rhythm and blues and doo-wop; this release featured "Tell Her About It", "Uptown Girl" and "The Longest Time", three of his best-known songs. After The Bridge and Storm Front in 1986 and 1989 respectively, Joel released his twelfth studio album, River of Dreams, in 1993. He went on to release Fantasies and Delusions, a 2001 album featuring classical compositions composed by Joel and performed by British-Korean pianist Richard Hyung-ki Joo. Joel provided voiceover work in 1988 for the Disney animated film Oliver & Company, in which he played the character Dodger with his song, "Why Should I Worry?", and contributed to the soundtracks to several different films, including Easy Money, Ruthless People, and Honeymoon in Vegas.

Across the 20 years of his solo career, Joel produced 33 self-penned Top 40 hits in the U.S., three of which ("It's Still Rock and Roll to Me", "Tell Her About It", and "We Didn't Start the Fire") reached the top of the Billboard Hot 100 charts. Joel has been nominated for 23 Grammy Awards, winning 6 of them, including Album of the Year for 52nd Street. Joel was inducted into the Songwriters Hall of Fame (1992), the Rock and Roll Hall of Fame (1999), and the Long Island Music Hall of Fame (2006). In 2001, Joel received the Johnny Mercer Award from the Songwriters Hall of Fame. In 2013, Joel received the Kennedy Center Honors for influencing American culture through the arts. Since the advent of his solo career, Joel has had a successful touring career, holding live performances across the globe. In 1987, he became one of the first artists to hold a rock tour in the Soviet Union following the country's alleviation of the ban on rock music. Though he has not released a pop rock album since River of Dreams, he continues to tour; he frequently performs at Madison Square Garden.

Early life, family and education 
William Martin Joel was born in the Bronx, New York on May 9, 1949. When he was one year old, his family moved to the Long Island suburb Hicksville, in the town of Oyster Bay, where he and his cousin Judy, whom his parents adopted, were raised in a section of Levitt homes.

Joel's father, Howard (born Helmut) Joel (1923–2011), a classical pianist and businessman, was born in Nuremberg, Germany to a Jewish family, the son of merchant and manufacturer Karl Amson Joel, and educated in Switzerland. His father had created a highly successful mail order textile business, Joel Macht Fabrik. To escape the Nazi regime, Howard's family emigrated to Switzerland. His father sold his business at a fraction of its value to emigrate. The family reached the United States via Cuba, because immigration quotas for German Jews prevented direct immigration at the time. In the United States, Howard became an engineer but always loved music. Joel's mother, Rosalind (1922–2014), was born in Brooklyn, New York to Jewish parents, Philip and Rebecca Nyman, who emigrated from England.

Joel's parents met in the late 1930s at City College of New York at a Gilbert and Sullivan performance. He has said that neither of his parents had talked much about World War II, which were such dark years; it was not until later that he learned more about his father's family. After Rosalind and Howard Joel divorced in 1957, Howard returned to Europe, as he had never liked the United States, considering the people uneducated and materialistic. He settled in Vienna, Austria and later remarried. Joel has a half-brother, Alexander Joel, born to his father in Europe, who became a classical conductor there. Alexander Joel was the chief musical director of the Staatstheater Braunschweig from 2001 to 2014.

Joel reluctantly began piano lessons at age four at his mother's insistence. His teachers included the noted American pianist Morton Estrin and musician Timothy Ford. Joel says that he is a better organist than pianist. As a teenager, Joel took up boxing so he could defend himself. He boxed successfully on the amateur Golden Gloves circuit for a short time, winning 22 bouts, but abandoned the sport shortly after his nose was broken in his 24th boxing match.

Although Joel's parents were Jewish, he was not raised in that religion. He attended a Roman Catholic church with friends. At age 11, he was baptized in a Church of Christ in Hicksville. He now identifies as an atheist.

Joel attended Hicksville High School until 1967, but did not graduate with his class. He was playing at a piano bar to help support himself, his mother and sister, and missed a crucial English exam after playing a late-night gig at a piano bar the evening before. Although Joel was a comparatively strong student, at the end of his senior year he did not have enough credits to graduate. Rather than attend summer school to earn his diploma, Joel decided to begin a career in music: "I told them, 'To hell with it. If I'm not going to Columbia University, I'm going to Columbia Records, and you don't need a high school diploma over there'." In 1992, he submitted essays to the school board in lieu of the missed exam. They were accepted, and he was awarded his diploma at Hicksville High's annual graduation ceremony 25 years after leaving.

Music career

1965–1970: Early career
Influenced by early rock and roll and rhythm and blues artists, including groups such as The Beatles, The Everly Brothers and Elvis Presley, Joel favored tightly structured pop melodies and down-to-earth songwriting. After seeing The Beatles on The Ed Sullivan Show, Joel decided to pursue a career in music. In an interview he said of the group's effect on him:

At age 16, Joel joined the Echoes, a group that specialized in British Invasion covers. The Echoes began recording in 1965. Joel played piano on several records released through Kama Sutra Productions and on recordings produced by Shadow Morton. Joel played on a demo version of "Leader of the Pack", which became a major hit for the Shangri-Las. Joel states that in 1964 he played on a recording of the Shangri-Las' "Remember (Walking in the Sand)" but he is unaware of whether he played on the demo or master version. The released single included a co-producer credit for Artie Ripp, who later was the first to sign and produce Joel as a solo artist after Michael Lang, who had given Joel a monetary advance, passed Joel along to Ripp to focus his attentions elsewhere.

In late 1965, the Echoes changed their name to the Emeralds, and then to the Lost Souls. Joel left the band in 1967 to join the Hassles, a Long Island group that had signed with United Artists Records. Over the next year and a half, they released four singles and two albums (The Hassles and Hour of the Wolf). All were commercial failures. Joel and drummer Jon Small left the Hassles in 1969 to form the duo Attila, releasing an eponymous debut album in July 1970. The duo disbanded the following October when Joel began an affair with Small's wife, Elizabeth. The pair later married.

1970–1974: Cold Spring Harbor and Piano Man

Joel signed a contract with the record company Family Productions, with which he recorded his first solo album, Cold Spring Harbor, a reference to Cold Spring Harbor, a hamlet on Long Island. Ripp states that he spent US$450,000 developing Joel; nevertheless, the album was mastered at too high a speed and as a result, the album was a technical and commercial disappointment.

The popular songs "She's Got a Way" and "Everybody Loves You Now" were originally released on this album, but went largely unnoticed until being released as live performances on Songs in the Attic (1981). Columbia released a remastered version of Cold Spring Harbor in 1983, with certain songs shortened or re-orchestrated.

Joel began his Cold Spring Harbor tour in the fall of 1971, touring with his band, which consisted of Rhys Clark on drums, Al Hertzberg on guitar, and Larry Russell on bass guitar, throughout the mainland United States and Puerto Rico, opening for groups such as the J. Geils Band, The Beach Boys, Badfinger, and Taj Mahal. Joel's performance at the Puerto Rican Mar y Sol Pop Festival was especially well-received; and although recorded, Joel refused to have it published on the Mar Y Sol compilation album Mar Y Sol: The First International Puerto Rico Pop Festival. Nevertheless, interest in his music grew.

During the spring of 1972, the Philadelphia radio station WMMR-FM began playing a concert recording of "Captain Jack", which became an underground hit on the East Coast. Herb Gordon, a Columbia Records executive, heard Joel's music and introduced him to the company. Joel signed a recording contract with Columbia in 1972 and moved to Los Angeles, California; he lived there for the next three years. For six months he worked at The Executive Room piano bar on Wilshire Boulevard as "Bill Martin". During that time, he composed his signature hit "Piano Man" about the bar's patrons.

Despite Joel's new contract, he was legally bound to Family Productions. Artie Ripp sold Joel's first contract to Columbia. Walter Yetnikoff, the president of CBS/Columbia Records at the time, bought back the rights to Joel's songs in the late 1970s, giving the rights to Joel as a birthday gift. Yetnikoff notes in the documentary film The Last Play at Shea that he had to threaten Ripp to close the deal.

Joel's first album with Columbia was Piano Man, released in 1973. Despite modest sales, Piano Mans title track became his signature song, ending nearly every concert. That year Joel's touring band changed. Guitarist Al Hertzberg was replaced by Don Evans, and bassist Larry Russell by Patrick McDonald, himself replaced in late 1974 by Doug Stegmeyer, who stayed with Joel until 1989. Rhys Clark returned as drummer and Tom Whitehorse as banjoist and pedal steel player; Johnny Almond joined as saxophonist and keyboardist. The band toured the U.S. and Canada extensively, appearing on popular music shows. Joel's songwriting began attracting more attention; in 1974 Helen Reddy recorded the Piano Man track "You're My Home".

1974–1977: Streetlife Serenade and Turnstiles
In 1974, Joel recorded his second Columbia album in Los Angeles, Streetlife Serenade. His manager at the time was Jon Troy, an old friend from New York's Bedford-Stuyvesant neighborhood; Troy was soon replaced by Joel's wife Elizabeth. Streetlife Serenade contains references to suburbia and the inner city. It is perhaps best known for "The Entertainer", a No. 34 hit in the U.S. Upset that "Piano Man" had been significantly cut for radio play, Joel wrote "The Entertainer" as a sarcastic response: "If you're gonna have a hit, you gotta make it fit, so they cut it down to 3:05." Although Streetlife Serenade was viewed unfavorably by critics, it contains the notable songs "Los Angelenos" and "Root Beer Rag", an instrumental that was a staple of his live set in the 1970s.

In late 1975, Joel played piano and organ on several tracks on Bo Diddley's The 20th Anniversary of Rock 'n' Roll all-star album.

Disenchanted with Los Angeles, Joel returned to New York City in 1975 and recorded Turnstiles, the first album he recorded with the musicians with whom he toured.  Produced by James William Guercio (then Chicago's producer), Turnstiles was first recorded at Caribou Ranch with members of Elton John's band. Dissatisfied with the result, Joel re-recorded the songs and produced the album himself.

"Say Goodbye to Hollywood" was a minor hit; Ronnie Spector recorded a cover as did Nigel Olsson, then drummer with Elton John. In a 2008 radio interview, Joel said that he no longer performs the song because singing it in its high original key "shreds" his vocal cords; however, he did finally play it live for the first time since 1982 when he sang it at the Hollywood Bowl in May 2014. Although never released as a single, "New York State of Mind" became one of Joel's best-known songs; Barbra Streisand recorded a cover and Tony Bennett performed it as a duet with Joel on Playing with My Friends: Bennett Sings the Blues. Other notable songs from the album include "Summer, Highland Falls"; "Miami 2017 (Seen the Lights Go Out on Broadway)"; and "Prelude/Angry Young Man", a concert mainstay.

1977–1979: The Stranger and 52nd Street 
Columbia Records introduced Joel to Phil Ramone, who produced all of Joel's studio albums from The Stranger (1977) to The Bridge (1986). The Stranger was an enormous commercial success, yielding four Top-25 hits on the Billboard charts: "Just the Way You Are" (No. 3), "Movin' Out" (No. 17), "Only the Good Die Young" (No. 24), and "She's Always a Woman" (No. 17). Joel's first Top Ten album, The Stranger was certified multi-platinum and reached number two on the charts, outselling Simon & Garfunkel's Bridge over Troubled Water, Columbia's previous bestselling album. The Stranger also featured "Scenes from an Italian Restaurant", an album-oriented rock classic, which has become one of his best-known songs.

"Just the Way You Are"—written for Joel's first wife, Elizabeth Weber—was inspired by a dream and won Grammy awards for Record of the Year and Song of the Year. On tour in Paris, Joel learned the news late one night in a hotel room. Rolling Stone ranked The Stranger the 70th greatest album of all time.

He released 52nd Street in 1978, naming it after Manhattan's 52nd Street, which, at the time of its release, served as the world headquarters of CBS/ Columbia. The album sold over seven million copies, propelled to number one on the charts by the hits "My Life" (No. 3), "Big Shot" (No. 14), and "Honesty" (No. 24). A cover of "My Life" (sung by Gary Bennett) became the theme song for a new television sitcom, Bosom Buddies, which featured actor Tom Hanks in one of his earliest roles. 52nd Street also won Grammy awards for Best Pop Vocal Performance, Male and Album of the Year.

In 1979, Joel traveled to Havana, Cuba to participate in the historic Havana Jam festival that took place between March 2–4, alongside Rita Coolidge, Kris Kristofferson, Stephen Stills, the CBS Jazz All-Stars, the Trio of Doom, Fania All-Stars, Billy Swan, Bonnie Bramlett, Mike Finnegan, Weather Report, and an array of Cuban artists such as Irakere, Pacho Alonso, Tata Güines and Orquesta Aragón. His performance is captured in Ernesto Juan Castellanos's documentary Havana Jam '79.

52nd Street was the first commercially released album on the then-new compact disc format, in 1982.

1979–1983: Glass Houses and The Nylon Curtain
The success of his piano-driven ballads like "Just the Way You Are", "She's Always a Woman", and "Honesty" led some critics to label Joel a "balladeer" and "soft rocker". Joel thought these labels were unfair and insulting, and with Glass Houses, he tried to record an album that proved that he could rock harder than his critics gave him credit for, occasionally imitating and referring to the style of new wave rock music that was starting to become popular at the time. On the front cover of the album, Joel is pictured in a leather jacket, about to throw a rock at a glass house (referring to the adage that "people who live in glass houses shouldn't throw stones").

Glass Houses spent six weeks at No. 1 on the Billboard chart and yielded the hits "You May Be Right" (used as the theme song, covered by Southside Johnny, for the CBS mid-1990s sitcom Dave's World) (No. 7, May 1980); "It's Still Rock and Roll to Me", which became Joel's first Billboard number-one single (for two weeks) in July 1980; "Don't Ask Me Why" (No. 19, September 1980); and "Sometimes a Fantasy" (No. 36, November 1980). "It's Still Rock and Roll to Me" spent 11 weeks in the top 10 of the Billboard Hot 100 and was the seventh biggest hit of 1980 according to American Top 40. His five sold-out shows at Madison Square Garden in 1980 earned him the Garden's Gold Ticket Award for selling more than 100,000 tickets at the venue.

Glass Houses won the Grammy for Best Rock Vocal Performance, Male. It also won the American Music Award for Favorite Album, Pop/Rock category. The album's closing song, "Through The Long Night" (B-side of the "It's Still Rock & Roll to Me" single), was a lullaby that featured Joel harmonizing with himself in a song he says was inspired by The Beatles' "Yes It Is". In a recorded Masterclass at the University of Pennsylvania, Joel later recollected that he had written to the Beatles asking them how to get started in the music industry. In response, he received a pamphlet about Beatles merchandise. This later led to the idea of Joel conducting Q&A sessions around the world answering questions that people had about the music industry.

His next release, Songs in the Attic, was composed of live performances of lesser-known songs from the beginning of his career. It was recorded at larger US arenas and in intimate night club shows in June and July 1980. This release introduced many fans, who discovered Joel when The Stranger became a smash in 1977, to many of his earlier compositions. The album reached No. 8 on the Billboard chart and produced two hit singles: "Say Goodbye to Hollywood" (No. 17), and "She's Got a Way" (No. 23). It sold over 3 million copies. Although not as successful as some of his previous albums, the album was still considered a success by Joel.

The next wave of Joel's career commenced with the recording of his next studio album, The Nylon Curtain. With it, Joel became more ambitious with his songwriting, trying his hand at writing topical songs like "Allentown" and "Goodnight Saigon". Joel has stated that he wanted the album to communicate his feelings about the American Dream and how changes in American politics during the Reagan years meant that "all of a sudden you weren't going to be able to inherit [the kind of life] your old man had." He also tried to be more ambitious in his use of the recording studio. Joel said that he wanted to "create a sonic masterpiece" on The Nylon Curtain. So he spent more time in the studio, crafting the sound of the album, than he had on any previous album. Production of The Nylon Curtain began in the fall of 1981. However, production was temporarily delayed when Joel was involved in a serious motorcycle accident on Long Island on April 15, 1982, severely injuring his hands. Still, Joel quickly recovered from his injuries, and the album only ended up being delayed by a few months.

In 1982, he embarked on a brief tour in support of the album. From one of the final shows of the tour, Joel made his first video special, Live from Long Island, which was recorded at the Nassau Veterans Memorial Coliseum in Uniondale, New York on December 30, 1982. It was originally broadcast on HBO in 1983 before it became available on VHS.

The Nylon Curtain went to No. 7 on the charts, partially due to heavy airplay on MTV for the videos to the singles "Allentown" and "Pressure".

1983–1988: An Innocent Man and The Bridge 

Joel's next album moved away from the serious themes of The Nylon Curtain and struck a much lighter tone. The album An Innocent Man was Joel's tribute to R&B and doo wop music of the 1950s and 1960s and resulted in Joel's second Billboard number-one hit, "Tell Her About It", which was the first single off the album in the summer of 1983. The album itself reached No. 4 on the charts and No. 2 in UK. It also boasted six top-30 singles, the most of any album in Joel's catalog. The album was well received by critics, with Stephen Thomas Erlewine, senior editor for AllMusic, describing Joel as being "in top form as a craftsman throughout the record, effortlessly spinning out infectious, memorable melodies in a variety of styles."

At the time that the album was released, WCBS-FM began playing "Uptown Girl" both in regular rotation and on the Doo Wop Live. The song became a worldwide hit upon its release. The music video of the song, originally written about then-girlfriend Elle MacPherson, featured future wife Christie Brinkley as a high-society girl who pulls her car into the gas station where Joel's character is working. At the end of the video, Joel's "grease monkey" character drives off with his "uptown girl" on the back of a motorcycle. When Brinkley went to visit Joel after being asked to star in the video, the first thing Joel said to her upon opening his door was "I don't dance". Brinkley had to walk him through the basic steps he does in the video. Their work together on this video shoot sparked a relationship between the two which led to their marriage in 1985.

In December, the title song, "An Innocent Man", was released as a single and it peaked at No. 10 in the U.S. and No. 8 in the UK, early in 1984. That March, "The Longest Time" was released as a single, peaking at No. 14 on the Hot 100 and No. 1 on the Adult Contemporary chart. That summer, "Leave a Tender Moment Alone" was released and it hit No. 27 while "Keeping the Faith" peaked at No. 18 in January 1985. In the video for "Keeping the Faith", Christie Brinkley also plays the "redhead girl in a Chevrolet". An Innocent Man was also nominated for the Album of the Year Grammy, but lost to Michael Jackson's Thriller.

Joel participated in the USA for Africa "We Are the World" project in 1985.

Following the success of An Innocent Man, Joel was asked about releasing an album of his most successful singles. This was not the first time this topic had come up, but Joel had initially considered "Greatest Hits" albums as marking the end of one's career. This time he agreed, and Greatest Hits Vol. 1 and 2 was released as a four-sided album and two-CD set, with the songs in the order in which they were released. The new songs "You're Only Human (Second Wind)" and "The Night Is Still Young" were recorded and released as singles to support the album; both reached the top 40, peaking at No. 9 and No. 34, respectively. Greatest Hits was highly successful and it has since been certified double diamond by the RIAA, with over 11.5 million copies (23 million units) sold. It is one of the best-selling albums in American music history, according to the RIAA.

Coinciding with the Greatest Hits album release, Joel released a two-volume Video Album that was a compilation of the promotional videos he had recorded from 1977 to the present time. Along with videos for the new singles off the Greatest Hits album, Joel also recorded a video for his first hit, "Piano Man", for this project.

Joel's next album, The Bridge (1986), did not achieve the level of success of his previous albums, but it yielded the hits "A Matter of Trust" and "Modern Woman" from the film Ruthless People, a dark comedy from the directors of Airplane! (both No. 10). In a departure from his "piano man" persona, Joel is shown in the video playing a Gibson Les Paul. The ballad "This is the Time" also charted, peaking at No. 18.

On November 18, 1986, an extended version of the song "Big Man on Mulberry Street" was used on a Season 3 episode of Moonlighting. The episode itself was also titled "Big Man on Mulberry Street".

The Bridge was Joel's last album to carry the Family Productions logo, after which he severed his ties with Artie Ripp. Joel has also stated in many interviews, most recently in a 2008 interview in Performing Songwriter magazine, that he does not think The Bridge is a good album.

In October 1986, Joel and his team started planning a trip to the Soviet Union. There were live performances at indoor arenas in Moscow, Leningrad and Tbilisi. Joel, his family (including young daughter Alexa), and his full touring band made the trip in July 1987. The entourage was filmed for television and video to offset the cost of the trip, and the concerts were simulcast on radio around the world. Joel's Russian tour was the first live rock radio broadcast in Soviet history. The tour was later cited frequently as one of the first fully staged pop rock shows to come to the Soviet Union, although in reality other artists had previously toured in the country before Joel, such as Elton John, James Taylor, and Bonnie Raitt.

Most of that audience took a long while to warm up to Joel's energetic show, something that had never happened in other countries he had performed in. According to Joel, each time the fans were hit with the bright lights, anybody who seemed to be enjoying themselves froze. In addition, people who were "overreacting" were removed by security. During this concert Joel, enraged by the bright lights, flipped his electric piano and snapped a microphone stand while continuing to sing. He later apologized for the incident.

The album КОНЦЕРТ (Russian for "Concert") was released in October 1987. Singer Pete Hewlett was brought in to hit the high notes on his most vocally challenging songs, like "An Innocent Man". Joel also did versions of The Beatles' classic "Back in the U.S.S.R." and Bob Dylan's "The Times They Are a-Changin". It has been estimated that Joel lost more than US$1 million of his own money on the trip and concerts, but he has said the goodwill he was shown there was well worth it.

1988–1993: Storm Front and River of Dreams 

The Disney animated children's film, Oliver & Company, released in November 1988, features Joel in a rare voice acting role, as the character Dodger, a sarcastic Jack Russell based on the Artful Dodger. The character's design is based on Joel's image at the time, including his trademark Wayfarer sunglasses. Joel also sang his character's song "Why Should I Worry?".

The recording of the album Storm Front, which commenced in 1988, coincided with major changes in Joel's career and inaugurated a period of serious upheaval in his business affairs. In August 1989, just before the album was released, Joel dismissed his manager (and former brother-in-law) Frank Weber after an audit revealed major discrepancies in Weber's accounting. Joel subsequently sued Weber for US$90 million, claiming fraud and breach of fiduciary duty and in January 1990 he was awarded US$2 million in a partial judgment against Weber; in April, the court dismissed a US$30 million countersuit filed by Weber.

The first single for the album, "We Didn't Start the Fire", was released in September 1989 and it became Joel's third—and most recent—US number-one hit, spending two weeks at the top. Storm Front was released in October, and it eventually became Joel's first number-one album since Glass Houses, nine years earlier. Storm Front was Joel's first album since Turnstiles to be recorded without Phil Ramone as producer. For this album, he wanted a new sound, and worked with Mick Jones of Foreigner. Joel is also credited as one of the keyboard players on Jones' 1988 self-titled solo album, and is featured in the official video for Jones' single "Just Wanna Hold"; Joel can be seen playing the piano while his then-wife Christie Brinkley joins him and kisses him. Joel also revamped his backing band, dismissing everyone but drummer Liberty DeVitto, guitarist David Brown, and saxophone player Mark Rivera, and bringing in new faces, including multi-instrumentalist Crystal Taliefero.

Storm Front second single, "I Go to Extremes" reached No. 6 in early 1990. The album was also notable for its song "Leningrad", written after Joel met a clown in the Soviet city of that name during his tour in 1987, and "The Downeaster Alexa", written to underscore the plight of fishermen on Long Island who are barely able to make ends meet. Another well-known single from the album is the ballad "And So It Goes" (No. 37 in late 1990). The song was originally written in 1983, around the time Joel was writing songs for An Innocent Man; but "And So It Goes" did not fit that album's retro theme, so it was held back until Storm Front. Joel said in a 1996 Masterclass session in Pittsburgh that Storm Front was a turbulent album and that "And So It Goes", as the last song on the album, portrayed the calm and tranquility that often follows a violent thunderstorm.

In the summer of 1992, Joel filed another US$90 million lawsuit against his former lawyer Allen Grubman, alleging a wide range of offenses including fraud, breach of fiduciary responsibility, malpractice and breach of contract but the case was eventually settled out of court for an undisclosed sum.

In 1992, Joel inducted the R&B duo Sam & Dave into the Rock & Roll Hall of Fame. That year, Joel also started work on River of Dreams, finishing the album in early 1993. Its cover art was a colorful painting by Christie Brinkley that was a series of scenes from each of the songs on the album. The eponymous first single was the last top 10 hit Joel has penned to date, reaching No. 3 on Billboard Hot 100 chart and ranking at No. 21 on the 1993 year-end Hot 100 chart. In addition to the title track, the album includes the hits "All About Soul" (with Color Me Badd on backing vocals) and "Lullabye (Goodnight, My Angel)", written for his daughter, Alexa. A radio remix version of "All About Soul" can be found on The Essential Billy Joel (2001), and a demo version appears on My Lives (2005).

The song "The Great Wall of China" was written about his ex-manager Frank Weber and was a regular in the setlist for Joel's 2006 tour. "2000 Years" was prominent in the millennium concert at Madison Square Garden, December 31, 1999, and "Famous Last Words" closed the book on Joel's pop songwriting for more than a decade.

1994–present: Touring

Beginning in 1994, Joel toured extensively with Elton John on a series of "Face to Face" tours, making them the longest running and most successful concert tandem in pop music history. During these shows, the two played their own songs, covered each other's songs, and performed duets. They grossed over US$46 million in just 24 dates in their sold out 2003 tour. Joel and John resumed their Face to Face tour in March 2009 and it continued until March 2010, where it ended in Albany, New York, at the Times Union Center. In February 2010, Joel denied rumors in the trade press that he canceled a summer 2010 leg of the tour, claiming there were never any dates booked and that he intended to take the year off. Joel told Rolling Stone magazine: "We'll probably pick it up again. It's always fun playing with him."

Joel and second wife Christie Brinkley announced on April 13, 1994, that they had separated, and their divorce was finalized in August 1994. The two remained friends.

1997's "To Make You Feel My Love" and "Hey Girl" both charted from Joel's Greatest Hits Volume III album. Joel wrote and recorded the song "Shameless" that was later covered by Garth Brooks and reached No. 1 on Billboard country charts. Joel performed with Brooks during his Central Park concert in 1997. To add onto his achievements Joel was inducted into the Rock 'n Roll Hall of Fame in 1999. Ray Charles made the induction speech and mentioned the duet Joel wrote for the two of them, "Baby Grand" (a track on Joel's album The Bridge released in 1986).

On December 31, 1999, Joel performed at New York's Madison Square Garden. At the time, Joel said that it would be his last tour and possibly his last concert. Two of his performances from that night, "We Didn't Start the Fire" and "Scenes from an Italian Restaurant" were filmed and featured that night as part of ABC's special New Year's Y2K coverage. The concert (dubbed The Night of the 2000 Years) ran for close to four hours and was later released as 2000 Years: The Millennium Concert.

In 2001, Joel released Fantasies & Delusions, a collection of classical piano pieces. All were composed by Joel and performed by Hyung-ki Joo. Joel often uses bits of these songs as interludes in live performances, and some of them are part of the score for the hit show Movin' Out. The album topped the classical charts at No. 1. Joel performed "New York State of Mind" live on September 21, 2001, as part of the America: A Tribute to Heroes benefit concert, and on October 20, 2001, along with "Miami 2017 (Seen the Lights Go Out on Broadway)", at the Concert for New York City in Madison Square Garden. That night, he also performed "Your Song" with Elton John.

In 2003, Joel inducted The Righteous Brothers into the Rock and Roll Hall of Fame, noting that his song "Until the Night" from the album 52nd Street was a tribute to the duo.

In 2005, Columbia released a box set, My Lives, which is largely a compilation of demos, b-sides, live/alternative versions and even a few Top 40 hits. The compilation also includes the Umixit software, in which people can remix "Zanzibar" and a live version of "I Go to Extremes" with their PC. Also, a DVD of a show from the River of Dreams tour is included.

On January 7, 2006, Joel began a tour across the U.S. Having not written, or at least released, any new songs in 13 years, he featured a sampling of songs from throughout his career, including major hits as well as obscure tunes like "Zanzibar" and "All for Leyna". His tour included an unprecedented 12 sold-out concerts over several months at Madison Square Garden in New York City. The singer's stint of 12 shows at Madison Square Garden broke a previous record set by New Jersey native Bruce Springsteen, who played 10 sold-out shows at the same arena. The record earned Joel the first retired number (12) in the arena owned by a non-athlete. This honor has also been given to Joel at the Wells Fargo Center (Philadelphia) (formerly the Wachovia Center) in Philadelphia where a banner in the colors of the Philadelphia Flyers is hung honoring Joel's 48 Philadelphia sold-out shows. He also had a banner raised in his honor for being the highest grossing act in the history of the Times Union Center (formerly the Knickerbocker Arena and Pepsi Arena) in Albany, New York. This honor was given to him as part of the April 17, 2007, show he did there. On June 13, 2006, Columbia released 12 Gardens Live, a double album containing 32 live recordings from a collection of the 12 different shows at Madison Square Garden during Joel's 2006 tour.

Joel visited the United Kingdom and Ireland for the first time in many years as part of the European leg of his 2006 tour. On July 31, 2006, he performed a free concert in Rome, with the Colosseum as the backdrop.

Joel toured South Africa, Australia, Japan, and Hawaii in late 2006, and subsequently toured the Southeastern U.S. in February and March 2007 before hitting the Midwest in the spring of 2007. On January 3 of that year, news was leaked to the New York Post that Billy had recorded a new song with lyrics—this being the first new song with lyrics he'd written in almost 14 years. The song, titled "All My Life", was Joel's newest single (with second track "You're My Home", live from Madison Square Garden 2006 tour) and was released into stores on February 27, 2007. On February 4, Joel sang the national anthem for Super Bowl XLI, becoming the first to sing the national anthem twice at a Super Bowl. On April 17, 2007, Joel was honored in Albany, New York for his ninth concert at the Times Union Center. He is now holding the highest box office attendance of any artist to play at the arena. A banner was raised in his honor marking this achievement.

On December 1, 2007, Joel premiered his new song "Christmas in Fallujah". The song was performed by Cass Dillon, a new Long Island based musician, as Joel felt it should be sung by someone in a soldier's age range (though he himself has played the song occasionally in concert.) The track was dedicated to servicemen based in Iraq. Joel wrote it in September 2007 after reading numerous letters sent to him from American soldiers in Iraq. "Christmas in Fallujah" is only the second pop/rock song released by Joel since 1993's River of Dreams. Proceeds from the song benefited the Homes For Our Troops foundation.

On January 26, 2008, Joel performed with the Philadelphia Orchestra celebrating the 151st anniversary of the Academy of Music. Joel performed his classical piece titled, "Waltz No. 2 (Steinway Hall)" from Fantasies and Delusions arranged by Brad Ellis. He also played many of his less well-known pieces, with full orchestral backing arranged by Mr. Ellis, including the rarely performed Nylon Curtain songs "Scandinavian Skies" and "Where's the Orchestra?".

On March 10, 2008, Joel inducted his friend John Mellencamp into the Rock and Roll Hall of Fame in a ceremony at the Waldorf Astoria Hotel in New York City.

Joel sold out 10 concerts at the Mohegan Sun Casino in Uncasville, Connecticut from May to July 2008. The casino honored him with a banner displaying his name and the number 10 to hang in the arena. On June 19, 2008, he played a concert at the grand re-opening of Caesars Windsor (formerly Casino Windsor) in Windsor, Ontario, Canada, to an invite-only crowd for Casino VIPs. His mood was light, and joke-filled, even introducing himself as "Billy Joel's dad" and stating "you guys overpaid to see a fat bald guy". He also admitted that Canadian folk-pop musician Gordon Lightfoot was the musical inspiration for "She's Always A Woman".

On July 16 and 18, 2008, Joel played the final concerts at Shea Stadium before its demolition. His guests included Tony Bennett, Don Henley, John Mayer, John Mellencamp, Steven Tyler, Roger Daltrey, Garth Brooks, and Paul McCartney. The concerts were featured in the 2010 documentary film Last Play at Shea. The film was released on DVD on February 8, 2011. The CD and DVD of the show, Live at Shea Stadium, were released on March 8, 2011.

On December 11, 2008, Joel recorded his own rendition of "Christmas in Fallujah" during a concert at Acer Arena in Sydney and released it as a live single in Australia only. It is the only official release of Joel performing "Christmas in Fallujah", as Cass Dillon sang on the 2007 studio recording and the handful of times the song was played live in 2007. Joel sang the song throughout his December 2008 tour of Australia.

On May 19, 2009, Joel's former drummer, Liberty DeVitto, filed a lawsuit in NYC claiming Joel and Sony Music owed DeVitto over 10 years of royalty payments. DeVitto had never been given songwriting or arranging credit on any of Joel's songs, but he claimed that he helped arrange some of them, including "Only the Good Die Young". In April 2010, it was announced that Joel and DeVitto amicably resolved the lawsuit.

2011 marked the 40th anniversary of the release of Joel's first album, Cold Spring Harbor. According to Joel's official website, to commemorate this anniversary, Columbia/Legacy Recordings originally planned "to celebrate the occasion with a definitive reissue project of newly restored and expanded Legacy editions of the complete Billy Joel catalog, newly curated collections of rarities from the vaults, previously unavailable studio tracks and live performances, home video releases and more", although this never fully came to fruition. The album Piano Man was re-released in a two-disc Legacy edition in November 2011.

In 2012, Joel signed an exclusive worldwide publishing agreement with Universal Music Publishing Group (UMPG), and its subsidiary Rondor Music International. Under the agreement, UMPG and Rondor replaced EMI Music Publishing in handling Joel's catalog outside the US. Additionally, the agreement marked the first time since Joel regained control of his publishing rights in the 1980s that he began to use an administrator to handle his catalog within the U.S. The agreement's focus is on increasing the use of Joel's music in movies, television programs, and commercials.

On December 12, 2012, Joel performed as part of 12-12-12: The Concert for Sandy Relief at Madison Square Garden, a concert held for all the victims of Hurricane Sandy. He changed the lyrics to "Miami 2017 (Seen the Lights Go Out on Broadway)" to make it relate to all the damage caused by Sandy.

In May 2013, it was announced that Joel would hold his first ever indoor Irish concert at the O2 in Dublin on November 1. He subsequently announced his return to the UK for the first time in seven years to perform in October and November. Joel played in Manchester and Birmingham as well as London's Hammersmith Apollo. In October, Joel held a surprise concert on Long Island at The Paramount (Huntington, New York) to benefit Long Island Cares. The venue holds a capacity of 1,555 and sold out in five minutes. Joel headlined a solo arena concert in New York City for the first time since 2006 when he performed at Barclays Center in Brooklyn on December 31, 2013.

Joel announced a concert residency at Madison Square Garden, playing one concert a month indefinitely, starting January 27, 2014. The first MSG show also launched the Billy Joel in Concert tour, which continued at the Amway Center (in Orlando, Florida) where Joel performed several cover songs such as Elton John's "Your Song", Billy Preston's "You Are So Beautiful" (in tribute to Joe Cocker), The Beatles' "With a Little Help from My Friends", "Can't Buy Me Love", and "When I'm 64", Robert Burns' "Auld Lang Syne", and AC/DC's "You Shook Me All Night Long" (with Brian Johnson). Joel also performed an unusual set, including the song "Souvenir" (from 1974's Streetlife Serenade) and excluding "We Didn't Start the Fire".

In 2015, Joel performed 21 concerts in addition to his monthly Madison Square Garden residency. His August 4, 2015, engagement at Nassau Coliseum was the final concert prior to the arena undergoing a US$261 million renovation. Joel returned to Nassau Coliseum on April 5, 2017, to play the first concert at the newly renovated venue. Later that month, Joel played the first concert at Atlanta's new SunTrust Park, the suburban home of the Atlanta Braves.

On June 24, 2017, he returned to Hicksville High School fifty years after his would-be graduating class received their diplomas, to deliver the honorary commencement address. It was also the 25th anniversary of receiving his own diploma from the same High School.

In 2019, Joel announced a concert at Camden Yards, home of the Baltimore Orioles, marking the first-ever concert at the baseball stadium. Joel was forced to postpone his concerts between March 2020 and August 2021 due to the COVID-19 pandemic.

Joel and Stevie Nicks jointly announced plans to perform a series of concerts across the United States in 2023, tentatively beginning with SoFi Stadium outside Los Angeles on March 10.

Other ventures 

In 1996, Joel merged his long-held love of boating with his desire for a second career. With Long Island boating businessman Peter Needham, he formed the Long Island Boat Company.

In November 2010, Joel opened a shop in Oyster Bay, Long Island, to manufacture custom-made, retro-styled motorcycles and accessories.

In 2011, Joel announced that he was releasing an autobiography that he had written with Fred Schruers, titled The Book of Joel: A Memoir. The book was originally going to be released in June 2011, but in March 2011 Joel decided against publishing the book and officially canceled his deal with HarperCollins. Rolling Stone noted, "HarperCollins acquired the book project for US$3 million in 2008. Joel is expected to return his advance on that sum to the publisher." According to Billboard, "the HarperCollins book was billed as an 'emotional ride' that would detail the music legend's failed marriage to Christie Brinkley, as well as his battles with substance abuse." In explaining his decision to cancel the book's release, Joel said, "It took working on writing a book to make me realize that I'm not all that interested in talking about the past, and that the best expression of my life and its ups and downs has been and remains my music." In 2014, Schruers published a biography, simply titled Billy Joel, based on his extensive personal interviews with Joel.

Personal life

Marriage and family

Joel's first wife was Elizabeth Weber Small. When their relationship began, she was married to Jon Small, his music partner in the short-lived duo Attila, with whom she had a son. When the affair was revealed, Weber severed her relationships with both men. Weber and Joel later reconciled and married in 1973, she then became his manager. His one-time producer Artie Ripp said Joel's songs "She's Got a Way" and "She's Always a Woman" were inspired by her, as was the waitress character in "Piano Man". They divorced on July 20, 1982.

Joel married a second time, to model Christie Brinkley, in March 1985. Their daughter, Alexa Ray Joel, was born December 29, 1985. Alexa was given the middle name of Ray after Ray Charles, one of Joel's musical idols. Joel and Brinkley divorced on August 26, 1994.

On October 2, 2004, Joel married chef Katie Lee, his third wife. At the time of the wedding, Lee was 23 and Joel was 55. Joel's daughter, Alexa Ray, then 18, served as maid of honor. Joel's second wife, Christie Brinkley, attended the union and gave the couple her blessing. On June 17, 2009, they announced their separation.

On July 4, 2015, Joel married a fourth time, to Alexis Roderick, an equestrian and former Morgan Stanley executive, at his estate on Long Island. He was 66, she was 33. Governor of New York Andrew Cuomo conducted the ceremony. The couple had been together since 2009. On August 12, 2015, the couple welcomed daughter Della Rose Joel.  The couple's second daughter, Remy Anne Joel, on October 22, 2017.

Joel bought a house in Centre Island, New York in 2002 for US$22 million. He also owns a house in Sag Harbor. Joel's waterfront residence in Manalapan, Florida went on the market in November 2015. On January 28, 2020, the 3.76-acre (1.52 ha) property sold for  US$10.2 million.

Health issues
Joel has suffered from severe depression for most of his life. In 1970, a career decline and personal tragedies worsened his moods. He left a suicide note and attempted to end his life by drinking furniture polish. Later he said, "I drank furniture polish. It looked tastier than bleach." His drummer and bandmate, Jon Small, rushed him to the hospital. Joel checked into Meadowbrook Hospital, where he was put on suicide watch and received treatment for depression.

In 1985, Joel recorded "You're Only Human (Second Wind)" as a message to help prevent teen suicide.

In 2002, Joel entered Silver Hill Hospital, a substance abuse and psychiatric center in New Canaan, Connecticut. In March 2005, he checked into the Betty Ford Center, where he spent 30 days for the treatment of alcohol abuse.

Politics
Although Joel has donated money to Democratic candidates running for office, he has never publicly affiliated himself with the Democratic Party. Although he is not known for publicly endorsing political candidates, he did play a benefit with Bruce Springsteen to raise money for Barack Obama's presidential campaign in 2008. He has performed at benefit concerts that have helped raise funds for political causes. However, about  celebrities endorsing political candidates, Joel has said, "People who pay for your tickets, I don't think they want to hear who you're going to vote for and how you think they should vote." Nonetheless, in 2016, after his sarcastic dedication of "The Entertainer" to then-Republican candidate Donald Trump was taken as a serious endorsement, Joel told the New York Daily News in an email that he would be voting for Hillary Clinton.

Discography

Awards and achievements 

Joel graduated well after his high school peers because of a missed English exam. His high school diploma was finally awarded by the school board 25 years later. Joel has been presented with multiple honorary doctorates:
 Doctor of Humane Letters from Fairfield University (1991)
 Doctor of Music from Berklee College of Music (1993)
 Doctor of Humane Letters from Hofstra University (1997)
 Doctor of Music from Southampton College (2000)
 Doctor of Fine Arts from Syracuse University (2006)
 Doctor of Musical Arts from the Manhattan School of Music (2008)
 Doctor of Music from Stony Brook University (2015)

In 1986, Joel was on the site selection committee for the Rock and Roll Hall of Fame board. Seven members of the committee voted for the Hall to be located in San Francisco, and seven voted for Cleveland, Ohio; this tie was broken when Joel voted for Cleveland. Joel was inducted into the Rock and Roll Hall of Fame in Cleveland in 1999 by one of his chief musical influences, Ray Charles, with whom he also collaborated on his song "Baby Grand" (1986).

Joel was also named MusiCares Person of the Year for 2002, an award given each year at the same time as the Grammy Awards. At the dinner honoring him, various artists performed versions of his songs, including Nelly Furtado, Stevie Wonder, Jon Bon Jovi, Diana Krall, Rob Thomas and Natalie Cole.

Joel has won five Grammys, including Album of the Year for 52nd Street and Song of the Year and Record of the Year for "Just the Way You Are".

In 1993, Joel was the second entertainer out of thirty persons to be inducted into the Madison Square Garden Walk of Fame. On September 20, 2004, Joel received a star on the Hollywood Walk of Fame, for his work in the music industry, located at 6233 Hollywood Boulevard. He was inducted into the Long Island Music Hall of Fame on October 15, 2006.

Joel is the only performing artist to have played both Yankee and Shea Stadiums, as well as Giants Stadium, Madison Square Garden, and Nassau Veterans Memorial Coliseum. Joel has banners in the rafters of the MVP Arena, Nassau Coliseum, Madison Square Garden, Mohegan Sun Arena in Uncasville, Connecticut, Wells Fargo Center in Philadelphia, Hartford Civic Center in Hartford, and the Carrier Dome in Syracuse.

In 2003, Rolling Stones 500 Greatest Albums of All Time list included The Stranger at number 67, and 52nd Street at number 352. And in 2004, on their 500 Greatest Songs of All Time list, Rolling Stone included "Piano Man" at number 421.

He has also sponsored the Billy Joel Visiting Composer Series at Syracuse University.

On December 12, 2011, Joel became the first non-classical musician honored with a portrait in Steinway Hall.

On December 29, 2013, in Washington, D.C., Joel received Kennedy Center Honors, the nation's highest honor for influencing American culture through the arts.

On July 22, 2014, the Library of Congress announced that Joel would be the sixth recipient of the Gershwin Prize for Popular Song. He received the prize at a performance ceremony in November 2014 from James H. Billington, the Librarian of Congress, and Supreme Court Justice Sonia Sotomayor.

On July 18, 2018, Governor Andrew Cuomo proclaimed the date to be Billy Joel Day in New York state to mark his 100th performance at Madison Square Garden.

Awards and nominations

See also 

 Billy Joel Band
 List of bestselling music artists
 List of highest-grossing concert tours

References

External links 

 
 
 
 
 Billy Joel on Instagram, archived at Ghostarchive.org. Archived from the original

 
1949 births
20th-century American composers
20th-century American keyboardists
20th-century American male musicians
20th-century American singers
20th-century classical composers
20th-century organists
21st-century American composers
21st-century American keyboardists
21st-century American male musicians
21st-century American singers
21st-century classical composers
21st-century organists
American atheists
American classical composers
American harmonica players
American male classical composers
American male organists
American male pianists
American male pop singers
American male singer-songwriters
American multi-instrumentalists
American people of English-Jewish descent
American people of German-Jewish descent
American pop pianists
American pop rock singers
American rock keyboardists
American rock pianists
American rock singers
American rock songwriters
American soft rock musicians
Billy Joel Band members
Columbia Records artists
Entertainers from the Bronx
Former Roman Catholics
Grammy Award winners
Grammy Legend Award winners
Jewish American atheists
Jewish American classical composers
Jewish American musicians
Jewish American songwriters
Jewish rock musicians
Jewish singers
Kennedy Center honorees
Living people
Musicians from the Bronx
Musicians from the New York metropolitan area
People from Hicksville, New York
Ragtime pianists
Singers from New York City
Singer-songwriters from New York (state)
Sony Classical Records artists
Tony Award winners